Glipa thoracica is a species of beetle in the genus Glipa. It was described in 1994.

References

thoracica
Beetles described in 1994